The Women's singles at the 2014 Commonwealth Games, was part of the lawn bowls competition, which took place between 24 and 27 July 2014 at the Kelvingrove Lawn Bowls Centre , Glasgow.

Sectional Play

Section A

Section B

Section C

Section D

Knockout stage

Quarterfinals

Semifinals

Finals

Gold medal

Bronze medal

References

Lawn bowls at the 2014 Commonwealth Games
Comm